Fourier–Motzkin elimination, also known as the FME method, is a mathematical algorithm for eliminating variables from a system of linear inequalities. It can output real solutions.

The algorithm is named after Joseph Fourier who proposed the method in 1826 and Theodore Motzkin who re-discovered it in 1936.

Elimination
The elimination of a set of variables, say V, from a system of relations (here linear inequalities) refers to the creation of another system of the same sort, but without the variables in V, such that both systems have the same solutions over the remaining variables.

If all variables are eliminated from a system of linear inequalities, then one obtains a system of constant inequalities. It is then trivial to decide whether the resulting system is true or false. It is true if and only if the original system has solutions. As a consequence, elimination of all variables can be used to detect whether a system of inequalities has solutions or not.

 those inequalities in which  plays no role, grouped into a single conjunction .

The original system is thus equivalent to
.

Obviously, this formula is equivalent to 
.

The inequality 
 

We have therefore transformed the original system into another system where  is eliminated. Note that the output system has  inequalities.

Example
Consider the following system of inequalities:

 

To eliminate x, we can write the inequalities in terms of x:

 

We have two inequalities with "≤" and two with "≥"; the system has a solution if the right-hand side of each "≤" inequality is at least the right-hand side of each "≥" inequality. We have 2*2 such combinations:

 

We now have a new system of inequalities, with one fewer variable.

Complexity
Running an elimination step over  inequalities can result in at most  inequalities in the output, thus running  successive steps can result in at most , a double exponential complexity. This is due to the algorithm producing many unnecessary constraints (constraints that are implied by other constraints). The number of necessary constraints grows as a single exponential. Unnecessary constraints may be detected using linear programming.

Imbert's acceleration theorems 

Two "acceleration" theorems due to Imbert permit the elimination of  redundant inequalities based solely on syntactic properties of the formula derivation tree, thus curtailing the need to solve linear programs or compute matrix ranks.

Define the history  of an inequality  as the set of indexes of inequalities from the initial system  used to produce . Thus,  for inequalities  of the initial system.

Suppose that the variables  have been officially eliminated. Each inequality  partitions the set  into :
 , the set of effectively eliminated variables, i.e. on purpose.
 , the set of implicitly eliminated variables, i.e. by accident.
,  all remaining variables.

A non-redundant inequality has the property that its history is minimal.

Theorem (Imbert's first acceleration theorem). If the history  of an inequality  is minimal, then .

An inequality that does not satisfy these bounds is necessarily redundant, and can be removed from the system without changing its solution set.

The second acceleration theorem detects minimal history sets:

Theorem (Imbert's second acceleration theorem). If the inequality  is such that , then  is minimal.

This theorem provides a quick detection criterion and is used in practice to avoid more costly checks, such as those based on matrix ranks. See the reference for implementation details.

Applications in information theory 

Information-theoretic achievability proofs result in conditions under which the existence of a well-performing coding scheme is guaranteed. These conditions are often described by linear system of inequalities. The variables of the system include both the transmission rates (that are part of the problem's formulation) and additional auxiliary rates used for the design of the scheme. Commonly, one aims to describe the fundamental limits of communication in terms of the problem's parameters only. This gives rise to the need of eliminating the aforementioned auxiliary rates, which is executed via Fourier–Motzkin elimination. However, the elimination process results in a new system that possibly contains more inequalities than the original. Yet, often some of the inequalities in the reduced system are redundant. Redundancy may be implied by other inequalities or by inequalities in information theory (a.k.a. Shannon type inequalities). A recently developed open-source software for MATLAB performs the elimination, while identifying and removing redundant inequalities.  Consequently, the software's outputs a simplified system (without redundancies) that involves the communication rates only.

Redundant constraint can be identified by solving a linear program as follows. Given a linear constraints system, if the -th inequality is satisfied for any solution of all other inequalities, then it is redundant. Similarly, STIs refers to inequalities that are implied by the non-negativity of information theoretic measures and basic identities they satisfy. For instance, the STI  is a consequence of the identity  and the non-negativity of conditional entropy, i.e., . Consequently, any STI can be proven via linear programming by checking if it is implied by the basic identities and non-negativity constraints. The described algorithm first performs Fourier–Motzkin elimination to remove the auxiliary rates. Then, it imposes the information theoretic non-negativity constraints on the reduced output system and removes redundant inequalities.

See also
Farkas' lemma – can be proved using FM elimination.
 Real closed field – the cylindrical algebraic decomposition algorithm performs quantifier elimination over polynomial inequalities, not just linear.

References

Further reading

External links 
 Chapter 1 of Undergraduate Convexity, textbook by Niels Lauritzen at Aarhus University.
 FME software for Information theory, open-source code in MATLAB by Ido B. Gattegno, Ziv Goldfeld and Haim H. Permuter.
 Symbolic Fourier-Motzkin elimination, open-source code in Python implementing the two Imbert acceleration theorems.

Optimization algorithms and methods
Real algebraic geometry